Past, Present and Future is Al Stewart's fifth studio album, released in October 1973 in the UK and in May 1974 in the US. This album is considered Stewart's first "major album" and it reached #133 on the Billboard Rock Album chart in 1974. He had taken on a different approach from his previous, folkier work, an approach that would stay with him for most of his career. All songs on this record have historical themes, each song representing a decade of the 20th century. The final song, "Nostradamus," is about the famous supposed prophet and his prophecies.

In the programme for the UK concert tour that promoted the album, Stewart is quoted as saying "My first four albums have been, for me, an apprenticeship. The new album.....is my thesis". It states that the album "is set for release on CBS in early October. Terminal Eyes is released as a single on September 28th."

The album was performed in its entirety live at the Royal Albert Hall in London, England on 16 May 2015 as part of Al Stewart's UK tour; the performance at the Royal Albert Hall also featured the live performance of the album Year of the Cat in its entirety.

Track listing

All tracks composed by Al Stewart.

Side one
"Old Admirals" – 5:54
"Warren Harding" – 2:39
"Soho (Needless to Say)" – 3:55
"The Last Day of June 1934" – 4:45
"Post World War Two Blues" – 4:17

Side two
"Roads to Moscow" – 8:00
"Terminal Eyes" – 3:22
"Nostradamus" – 9:43

Charts
Album – Billboard (United States)

Personnel 

 Al Stewart – acoustic guitar, vocals
 Tim Renwick – electric guitar
 Peter Berryman – acoustic guitar
 Isaac Guillory – acoustic guitar, classical guitar
 B.J. Cole – steel guitar
 Bruce Thomas – bass
 Brian Odgers – bass
 John Wilson – drums
 Peter Wood – keyboards, piano, accordion
 Rick Wakeman – piano, keyboards
 Tim Hinkley – keyboards
 Bob Andrews – keyboards
 Bob Sargeant – keyboards
 Francis Monkman – Moog synthesizer
 Alistair Anderson – English concertina
 Richard Hewson – string arrangements
 Haim Romano – mandolin
 Dave Swarbrick – mandolin
 Luciano Bravo – steel band
 Lennox James – steel band
 Michael Oliver – steel band
 Frank Ricotti – percussion
 Roger Taylor – percussion
 Krysia Kocjan – backing vocals
 John Donelly – backing vocals
 Mick Welton – backing vocals
 Kevin Powers – backing vocals
Technical
 Mike Stone – engineer
 Mario Grattarola - photography

Cover art 

The UK cover (CBS) is of gatefold design, with a photo of Al Stewart, unusually wearing a three-piece suit, leaning on a mantelpiece in a drawing room.  The picture was taken by photographer and film director Mario Grattarola at the Geffrye Museum in Shoreditch, London. The album's inner section and back cover include all song lyrics, brief notes by the artist about each song and also a contribution by author Erika Cheetham about Nostradamus. The US album cover (Janus Records), by Hipgnosis and George Hardie, is a photography-like rendition of the Marvel Comics character Doctor Strange using his Cloak of Levitation to travel through a hole created in the air into an alternative universe.

References

Al Stewart albums
1973 albums
Albums with cover art by Hipgnosis
Albums produced by John Anthony (record producer)
Albums recorded at Trident Studios
CBS Records albums
Janus Records albums
Arista Records albums